Colors Tamil is an Indian Tamil-language general entertainment pay television channel owned by Viacom 18 on 19 February 2018. The channel's headquarters is in Chennai, Tamil Nadu. The network's programming consists of Tamil Series, Comedies, youth-oriented reality shows, Cooking Show and Movies.

Colors Tamil's SD feed was rebranded from NXT, while the HD feed was previously known as ZAP. The channel partnership with Columbia pictures for Hollywood movies.

Programming

Availability
The channel available across India through Cable and DTH services and Singapore through Starhub and Singtel. In Malaysia via Astro and other countries through satellite and cable. It is also available through digital and mobile entertainment platform, Voot.

References

External links
 

Tamil-language television channels
Television stations in Chennai
Mass media in Tamil Nadu
Television channels and stations established in 2018
Viacom 18